Ward of the Nation is a French civil status allocated by the State to those who have a parent who was injured or killed in war, or (since the November 2015 Paris attacks) during a terrorist incident, or while carrying out certain public services.  

Partly symbolic as "adoptees of the Nation" and partly remunerative, it goes beyond a Ward of the State, which in France is a minor person, such as an orphan, under the care and responsibility of the French state.

References 

French Army
Military of France
Military history of France
1917 establishments in France
Organizations based in France
Disability organizations based in France
Non-profit organizations based in France